Florence Township may refer to:

Illinois
 Florence Township, Will County, Illinois
 Florence Township, Stephenson County, Illinois

Iowa
 Florence Township, Benton County, Iowa

Michigan
 Florence Township, Michigan

Minnesota
 Florence Township, Goodhue County, Minnesota

New Jersey
 Florence Township, New Jersey

Ohio
 Florence Township, Erie County, Ohio
 Florence Township, Williams County, Ohio

South Dakota
 Florence Township, Hamlin County, South Dakota, in Hamlin County, South Dakota
 Florence Township, Hand County, South Dakota, in Hand County, South Dakota

Township name disambiguation pages